Karen is a slang term for a white woman perceived as entitled or demanding beyond the scope of what is normal. The term is often portrayed in memes depicting white women who use their white privilege to demand their own way. Depictions include demanding to "speak to the manager", being racist, or wearing a particular bob cut hairstyle. A notable example was the Central Park birdwatching incident in 2020.

The term has been considered pejorative by those who believe it is sexist, ageist, classist, and is used to control women's behavior. As of 2020, the term increasingly appeared in media and social media as a general criticism of middle class white women, including during the COVID-19 pandemic and George Floyd protests. The term has also been applied to male behavior. The Guardian called 2020 "the year of Karen".

Origin 
In African-American culture, there is a history of calling difficult white women or those who "weaponize" their position by a generic pejorative name. In the antebellum era (1815–1861), "Miss Ann" was used. In the early 1990s, "Becky" was used. As late as 2018, before the use of "Karen" caught on, alliterative names matching particular incidents were used, such as "Barbecue Becky", "Cornerstore Caroline", and "Permit Patty". Linguist Kendra Calhoun connects "Karen" stereotypes to the older "soccer mom".

For the term "Karen", several possible origins have been proposed. Early uses of Karen as a joke punchline include the airheaded character Karen (played by Amanda Seyfried) from the 2004 film Mean Girls, Dane Cook's 2005 sketch  "The Friend Nobody Likes" on his album Retaliation, and a 2016 Internet meme regarding a woman in an ad for the Nintendo Switch console who exhibits perceived antisocial behavior and is given the nickname "antisocial Karen". In December 2017, Karen memes regarding entitled women went viral on Reddit, the earliest being from user karmacop9, who ranted about his ex-wife Karen. The posts led to the creation of the subreddit r/FuckYouKaren, containing memes about the posts, and inspiring spinoffs including r/karen and r/EntitledKarens dedicated to criticizing Karens.

A more pointed explanation, which involves race, is the expression originating among Black people to refer to unreasonable white women. The term was popularized on Black Twitter as a meme used to describe white women who "tattle on black kids' lemonade stands" or who unleash the "violent history of white womanhood". Now defunct Bitch magazine described Karen as a term that originated with Black women but was co-opted by white men. In an article on high profile incidents in the U.S. of white women calling the police on Black people, The Guardian called 2020 "the year of Karen".

Meaning and use 
Kansas State University professor Heather Suzanne Woods, whose research interests include memes, said a Karen's defining characteristics are a sense of entitlement, a willingness and desire to complain, and a self-centered approach to interacting with others. According to Woods, a Karen "demands the world exist according to her standards with little regard for others, and she is willing to risk or demean others to achieve her ends." Rachel Charlene Lewis, writing for Bitch, agrees, saying a Karen doesn't view others as individuals and instead moves "through the world prepared to fight faceless conglomerate of lesser-than people who won't give her what she wants and feels she deserves."

The meme carries several stereotypes, the most notable being that a Karen will demand to "speak to the manager" of a hypothetical service provider. Other stereotypes include anti-vaccination beliefs, racism, excessive use of Facebook, and a particular bob haircut with blond highlights. Pictures of Kate Gosselin and Jenny McCarthy's bob cut are often used to depict a Karen, and their bobs are sometimes called the "can-I-speak-to-your-manager?" haircut.

According to Apryl Williams of the University of Michigan, the memes "actively call out white supremacy and call for restitution".

Racial context 
Time called the meme "Internet shorthand ... for a particular kind of racial violence white women have instigated for centuries—following a long and troubling legacy of white women in the country weaponizing their victimhood." University of Virginia media researcher Meredith Clark has said that the idea of a white woman in the vicinity of whom Black people feel a need to be careful because she would not hesitate to use her "privilege" at the expense of others "has always been there; it just hasn't always been so specific to one person's name". Karen Grigsby Bates agrees that Karen is part of a succession of characters like Miss Ann and Becky, adding that the concept of Karen, as Black people had been using the term, became clear to white people when Saturday Night Live played a Jeopardy sketch with Chadwick Boseman playing as his Black Panther character T'Challa. The Guardian notes that "the image of a white woman calling police on Black people put the lie to the myth of racial innocence". Contemporary Karens have been compared to Carolyn Bryant (a white woman who accused Emmett Till of offending her, resulting in his lynching) and Mayella Ewell (a fictional character in the 1960 novel To Kill a Mockingbird).

The meme became most popular in 2020 when the Black Lives Matter movement surged in response to multiple events. Andre Brock, a Georgia Tech professor of Black digital culture, connected the virality of the meme in the summer of 2020 with the coronavirus pandemic, the murder of George Floyd, and the Central Park birdwatching incident, noting that both incidents had occurred the same weekend during a period when much of the world had been forced to stay home and had plenty of free time to watch the videos. He said the virality of the two videos was the result of an "interest convergence" in which the pandemic "intersected with collective outrage over police brutality" and "highlighted the extreme violence—and potentially fatal consequences—of a white woman selfishly calling the cops out of spite and professed fear." Apryl Williams of the University of Michigan called it a "Black activist meme", saying it was ultimately beneficial in helping people recognize problematic behaviors, but warning that jokes downplayed the threat posed to Black people.

Multiple writers have rejected accusations of the term being a slur against white women. Karen Attiah, Global Opinions editor for The Washington Post, claims that it lacks the historical context to be a slur and that calling it one trivializes actual discrimination.

Male context 
The term is generally used to refer to women, but The Atlantic noted that "a man can easily be called a Karen", with staff writer David A. Graham calling then-president Donald Trump the "Karen in chief". Similarly, in November 2020, a tweet calling Elon Musk "Space Karen" over comments he made regarding the effectiveness of COVID-19 testing became viral. Numerous names for a male equivalent of Karen have been floated, with little agreement on a single name, although 'Ken' and 'Kevin' are among the most common names used. The Jim Crow era male equivalent to Miss Ann was Mister Charlie.

Criticism 
The term has been called sexist, ageist, classist, and anti-woman by some. Hadley Freeman, columnist and features writer for The Guardian, argues that use of the meme has become less about describing behavior than controlling it and "telling women to shut up". Jennifer Weiner, writing in The New York Times during the COVID-19 pandemic, said the meme had succeeded in silencing her, saying she had had to balance her desire to complain about a nearby man coughing into the open air, hawking and spitting on the sidewalk, with her fear of being called a Karen. In August 2020, Helen Lewis wrote in The Atlantic, "Karen has become synonymous with woman among those who consider woman an insult. There is now a market, measured in attention and approbation, for anyone who can sniff out a Karen." Lewis also noted what she called the "finger trap" of the term, saying "What is more Karen than complaining about being called 'Karen'? There is a strong incentive to be cool about other women being Karened, lest you be Karened yourself."

British journalist and feminist Julie Bindel asked, "Does anyone else think the 'Karen' slur is woman-hating and based on class prejudice?" Freeman replied, saying it was "sexist, ageist, and classist, in that order". Kaitlyn Tiffany, writing in The Atlantic, asked, "Is a Karen just a woman who does anything at all that annoys people? If so, what is the male equivalent?", saying the meme was being called misogynistic. Nina Burleigh wrote that the memes "are merely excuses to heap scorn on random middle-aged white women". Matt Schimkowitz, a senior editor at Know Your Meme, stated to Business Insider in 2019 that the term "just kind of took over all forms of criticism towards white women online", and that it had risen to popularity due to that demographic being seen as entitled.

Notable examples 

In 2018 a former New York and New Jersey Port Authority police commissioner, Caren Turner, was filmed berating two Tenafly, New Jersey, police officers for pulling over a car in which her daughter was riding. The video only emerged later.

In December 2019, Australian media reported that in the town of Mildura, a woman named Karen had been filmed trying to pull down an Aboriginal flag being displayed by her neighbors. She was unable to pull it down, leading to a Twitter hashtag #TooStrongForYouKaren and other social media responses.

Throughout the COVID-19 pandemic, the term has been used to describe women abusing Asian-American health workers due to the virus's origins in Mainland China, those hoarding essential supplies such as toilet paper, and both those who policed others' behavior to enforce quarantine and those who protested the continuance of the restrictions because they prevented them visiting hair salons, as well as over being forced to wear face masks inside of stores, prompting one critic to ask whether the term had devolved into an all-purpose term of disapproval or criticism for middle-aged white women. Use of the term increased from 100,000 mentions on social media in January 2020 to 2.7 million in May 2020.

In May 2020, Christian Cooper, writing about the Central Park birdwatching incident, said Amy Cooper's "inner Karen fully emerged and took a dark turn" when he started recording the encounter. He recorded her calling the police and telling them that an "African-American man" was threatening her and her dog.

On December 16, 2020, Miya Ponsetto was dubbed "SoHo Karen" after tackling 14-year-old Keyon Harrold Jr., son of jazz trumpeter Keyon Harrold, in the lobby of the Arlo Hotel in New York City and accusing him of stealing her phone. Ponsetto alleged that she was assaulted during the altercation, though she could not provide evidence to her claim. An Uber driver returned her phone after the incident. In early January 2021, Ponsetto was arrested in Ventura County, California and extradited to New York, where she was charged with grand larceny, attempted robbery, child endangerment, and two counts of assault, as she also attacked Harrold Sr. during the altercation. It was also revealed that Ponsetto was arrested twice in 2020 for public intoxication and drunk driving. During the initial court hearing in March 2021, Ponsetto interrupted the judge by requesting to avoid jail time.

Legislation 

In July 2020, San Francisco Board of Supervisors member Shamann Walton introduced the Caution Against Racially Exploitative Non-Emergencies (CAREN) Act, which proposed changing the San Francisco Police Code to prohibit the fabrication of racially biased emergency reports. The Act was passed unanimously in October of that year, after which Williams noted "these memes are actually doing logical and political work of helping us get to legal changes".

Other uses 
The mid-2019 formation of Tropical Storm Karen in the Atlantic hurricane basin led to memes likening the storm to the stereotype; several users made jokes about the storm wanting to "speak with the manager", with images photoshopped to include the "Karen haircut" on either the hurricane or its forecast path.

In July 2020, Domino's Pizza ran an advertisement in Australia and New Zealand offering free pizzas to "nice Karens"; the company later apologized and dropped the ad amidst criticism.

In July 2020, an internet meme in the form of a parody advertisement for a fictional American Girl "Girl of the Year" character depicted as a personification of the "Karen" stereotype, wearing a track suit, bob haircut and openly carrying a semi-automatic pistol while defiantly violating face mask guidelines mandated due to the COVID-19 pandemic, provoked criticism from the doll line, who took umbrage to the use of their name and trade dress, stating that they were "disgusted" by a post from brand strategist Adam Padilla under the online persona "Adam the Creator", and "are working with the appropriate teams at American Girl to ensure this copyright violation is handled appropriately." Boing Boing, however, expressed doubts over the merits of American Girl's proposed legal action against the "Karen" parodies citing the Streisand effect, though it has also noted the debate on whether the satirical intent of the parody advertisement is protected by law.

In July 2020, the BBC called the Wall of Moms "a good example of mainly middle-class, middle-aged white women explicitly not being Karens. Instead, the Wall of Moms is seen by activists as using their privilege to protest against the very same systemic racism and classism that Karens actively seek to exploit."

Karens for Hire began in early 2022, charging a fee to help people with complaints against companies.

Related terms
The Filipino slang term Marites bears a similar meaning and connotation to Karen, although the term is more often used in a humorous or light-hearted way, especially in reference to the stereotypical gossip-monger in Filipino neighborhoods.

See also 

 Karen (film)
 Becky (slang)
 Bye, Felicia
 Bye Felipe
 Chad (slang)
 Cracker (term)
 Gammon (insult)
 OK boomer
 Trixie (slang)
 Will to power
 White fragility

Notes

References

External links 
 

Internet memes introduced in 2017
Pejorative terms for white women
Stereotypes of middle class women
Stereotypes of white Americans
Slang terms for people
American slang
Misogyny
Black Lives Matter
White supremacy in the United States